The Beatmasters are an English electronic music group who gained success in the UK in the late 1980s with four top 20 hit singles. They then went on to produce and remix records for many other artists. The group's string of chart hit singles include "Burn It Up", "Hey DJ! (I Can't Dance to that Music You're Playing)", "Who's in the House" (featuring Merlin) and "Rok da House". The latter, having been recorded in 1986, is one of the earliest examples of hip house and most likely the first song of the genre. Hip house is a subgenre of house music which features rap vocals performed over a house rhythm track.

Their initial success brought comparisons with pop record producers Stock Aitken Waterman, but the Beatmasters cited rival producers Coldcut as their major competitor.

Formation
Manda Glanfield and Paul Carter (both regulars on the London club scene) were working in the TV commercial jingle industry where they were introduced to third member, Richard Walmsley. Signing to the burgeoning record label Rhythm King, they joined labelmates Bomb the Bass and S'Express in regularly appearing in the top 40 of the UK Singles Chart during 1988 and 1989.

The group had seven UK chart singles, including the No. 14 hit "Burn It Up", which featured P. P. Arnold and "Rok da House" with the Cookie Crew, which was their first and biggest hit, peaking at No. 5 in early 1988. Another notable single was "Hey DJ - I Can't Dance to that Music You're Playing" / "Ska Train", which introduced the rapper/singer Betty Boo to the general public and gave the group a No. 7 chart hit in 1989.

They released two albums under the Beatmasters moniker: Anywayawanna (1989) and Life & Soul (1992). These albums were later repackaged on BMG Records under the title Anywayawanna – The Best of the Beatmasters (2004).

Carter and Glanfield forged a successful writing, remixing and production career. Their first success as a duo came in 1991 with a reworking of the re-released Shamen single "Move Any Mountain/Progen91" which charted at No. 4. In 1992, production work commenced on the Shamen album Boss Drum, which included the singles "LSI (Love Sex Intelligence)", "Phorever People" and the highly controversial "Ebeneezer Goode" - the latter spending a month at No. 1 on the UK Singles Chart.

They went on to write, produce and remix for many other artists including Marc Almond, Pet Shop Boys, Blur, Roachford, Betty Boo, Naomi Campbell, Adam Rickitt, Moby, Aswad, Eternal, Tina Turner, David Bowie, Depeche Mode, Scooch and Girls Aloud. Still working, the Beatmasters continue to produce dance, pop and rock music.

Members
 Manda Glanfield (born 27 January 1961) – songwriter/producer
 Paul Carter (born 27 May 1961) – songwriter/producer
 Richard Walmsley (born 28 September 1962) – songwriter/producer
 Pete Brazier (born 8 April 1971) - songwriter/producer (2022–present)

Discography

Albums
 Anywayawanna (1989) - UK No. 30, AUST No. 100
 Life & Soul (1991)
 Anywayawanna – The Best of the Beatmasters (2004) (compilation)

Singles

Selected productions
 "Females" - Cookie Crew (1987)
 "Born Free" - MC Merlin (1987)
 "Stay Away" - Hotline (1988)
 "Stand Up for Your Love Rights" - Yazz (1989)
 "Doin the Do" - Betty Boo (1990)
 "Could This Be Love?" - Kerry Shaw (1993)
 "Shine" - Aswad (1994)
 "Warriors" - Aswad (1994)
 "Danger in Your Eyes" - Aswad (1995)
 "Bubblin Hot" - Pato Banton (1995)
 "Space" - Bond (2002)
 "Kashmir" - Bond (2002)
 "Allegretto" - Bond (2002)
 "Gypsy Rhapsody" - Bond (2002)
 "Boogie Down Love" - Girls Aloud (2003)
 "Love Bomb" - Girls Aloud (2003)
 "Marrs Attack" - Girls Aloud (2003)
 "Grease" - Girls Aloud (2003)
 "Wigwam" - Wigwam (Alex James/Betty Boo) (2006)
 "Blink" - Helicopter Girl (2008)
 "Metropolitan" - Helicopter Girl (2008)
 "Hey DJ 2009" - The Beatmasters (2009)

Selected remixes
 "Behind the Wheel" - Depeche Mode (1987)
 "Route 66" - Depeche Mode (1987)
 "These Things Happen" - Viola Wills (1988)
 "Move Any Mountain/Progen" - The Shamen (1991)
 "L.S.I." - The Shamen (1992)
 "Phorever People" - The Shamen (1992)
 "Ebeneezer Goode" - The Shamen (1992)
 "Boss Drum" - The Shamen (1992)
 "Comin On Strong" - The Shamen (1992)
 "Lucy Can't Dance" - David Bowie (1992)
 "Destination Eschaton" - The Shamen (1995)
 "Transamazonia" - The Shamen (1995)
 "MK2A" - The Shamen (1995)
 "Fall from Grace" - Eskimos and Egypt (1993)
 "Disco Inferno" - Tina Turner (1993)
 "Everytime You Touch Me" - Moby (1993)
 "I Wouldn't Normally Do This Kind of Thing" - Pet Shop Boys (1993)
 "Adored and Explored" - Marc Almond (1994)
 "Jungle Warrior" - Aswad (1994)
 "I Love Saturday" - Erasure (1994)
 "Run to the Sun" - Erasure (1994)
 "Into the Blue" - Moby (1995)
 "Shine" - Aswad (1995)
 "Boys and Girls" - Blur (1995)
 "Down" - Roachford (1995)
 "Still Be Lovin' You" - Damage (2000)
 "So What If I" - Damage (2000)
 "Sugar Baby" - Elizabeth Troy (2000)
 "Minus 10 Degrees" - Elizabeth Troy (2000)
 "I Got U" - Elizabeth Troy (2000)
 "Lover" - LMC (2005)

References

External links
[ Allmusic.com entry]

Musical groups established in 1986
English record producers
Musical groups from London
English electronic music groups
English house music groups
Hip house music groups
British musical trios
British songwriting teams
British record production teams
Record production trios
Remixers
EMI Records artists
London Records artists
Rhythm King artists
SBK Records artists
Sire Records artists